Wallace Bain (1 June 1917 – 17 June 2005) was a New Zealand cricketer. He played in eight first-class matches for Wellington from 1937 to 1945.

See also
 List of Wellington representative cricketers

References

External links
 

1917 births
2005 deaths
New Zealand cricketers
Wellington cricketers
Cricketers from Auckland